Hasanabad (also Romanized as Ḩasanābād; also known as Khasanabad) is a village in Belesbeneh Rural District, Kuchesfahan District, Rasht County, Gilan Province, Iran. At the 2006 census, its population was 314, in 76 families.

References 

Populated places in Rasht County